American Holocaust: Columbus and the Conquest of the New World is a multidisciplinary book about the indigenous peoples of the Americas and colonial history written by American scholar and historian David Stannard.

Francis Jennings of Early American Literature  wrote:

Samuel R. Cook of The American Indian Quarterly wrote:

This book generated significant of critical commentary. Stannard responded to some of it in an essay titled "Uniqueness as Denial: The Politics of Genocide Scholarship", published in Is the Holocaust Unique?, edited by Alan S. Rosenbaum.

Summary

Stannard begins with a description of the cultural and biological diversity in the Americas prior to contact in 1492. The book surveys the history of European colonization in the Americas, for approximately 400 years, from the first Spanish assaults in the Caribbean in the 1490s to the Wounded Knee Massacre in the 1890s--the indigenous inhabitants of North and South America have suffered dispossession, oppression and exploitation. During that time the indigenous population of the Western Hemisphere declined by as many as 100 million people. 
The author follows the path of colonialism from the Caribbean to Mexico and Central and South America, then North America to Florida, Virginia, and New England, and finally out across the Great Plains and Southwest to California and the North Pacific Coast. Stannard reveals that wherever Europeans or their descendants went, the native people were caught between imported epidemics and colonialism, typically resulting in the annihilation of 95 percent of their populations. 

The author explores the history of ancient European and Christian attitudes toward religion, race, and war, he finds the cultural ground well prepared by the end of the Middle Ages for the centuries-long genocide campaign that Europeans and their descendants launched--and in places continue to wage--against indigenous peoples of the Americas. Stannard suggests that the perpetrators of the American Holocaust drew on the same ideological foundations as did the later architects of the Nazi Holocaust. He writes that 
the indigenous genocides in the New World were based upon the proposition that American Indians were biologically, racially, and inher­ently inferior. Thus, the process of “dehumanization” results in sadism and genocide in the personifications of entire peoples (p. 253). It is an ideology of Western supremacy that remains alive today, he adds, and one that in recent years has resulted in American justifications for military interventions overseas. 

Wilbur Jacobs of Journal of American Ethnic History wrote:

Stannard concludes that America’s indigenous peoples are still faced with the dilemma going back to 1492. Their choice then was to give up their religion, their lands and culture or suffer further punishment the European colonizers would inflict (p. 258).

Contents

Part 1: Before Columbus

Part 2: Pestilence and Genocide

Part 3: Sex, Race and Holy War

Appendix I: On Pre-Columbian Settlement and Population

Appendix II: On Racism and Genocide

See also
Genocide of indigenous peoples
Population history of Indigenous peoples of the Americas
White supremacy
White nationalism

References

Further reading 
Bessis, Sophie (2003). Western Supremacy: The Triumph of an Idea?  Zed Books. London, UK.   
 David Stannard (1996). "Uniqueness as Denial: The Politics of Genocide Scholarship", published in Is the Holocaust Unique? edited by Alan S. Rosenbaum. Westview Press. Boulder, Colorado, USA.  
Dunbar-Ortiz, Roxanne (2015). An indigenous peoples' history of the United States. Beacon Press, Boston, USA.  
Lindqvist, Sven (1996). Exterminate all the brutes.  New Press, New York, USA.  

1993 non-fiction books
Anti-imperialism
Colonialism
Books about political power
Genocide
Genocide of indigenous peoples of the Americas